Vaccinium crassifolium, the creeping blueberry, is a species of Vaccinium in the heath family. It is native to the four southeastern U.S. states of Virginia, North Carolina, South Carolina, and Georgia. It is an evergreen shrub with shiny dark green to bronze leaves.

Distribution and habitat
Vaccinium crassifolium is native to the coastal plain of Georgia, the Carolinas, and southeastern Virginia, especially in pine barrens but also in disturbed settings like roadsides and other open areas.

Taxonomy
Vaccinium crassifolium is the only species in Vaccinium sect. Herpothamnus. Some sources have recognized a second species, V. sempervirens, but recent authors combine the two into a single species. 

Creeping blueberries, although they are native to North America, do not seem to be most closely related to North American blueberries, but instead to South American Vaccinium species.

Uses

Medicinal
The leaves resemble bearberry (Arctostaphylos uva-ursi), and may be used in herbalism in its place.

Cultivation
Vaccinium crassifolium has been cultivated since at least about 1787, and several cultivars are available for planting as a ground cover in landscaping gardens.

References

External links
United States Department of Agriculture plants profile— Vaccinium crassifolium

crassifolium
Berries
Flora of the Southeastern United States
Plants described in 1800
Bird food plants
Medicinal plants
Taxa named by Henry Cranke Andrews